Scrobipalpa perinii is a moth in the family Gelechiidae. It was described by Klimesch in 1951. It is found in southern France, northern Italy, Slovenia, North Macedonia and Greece.

References

Scrobipalpa
Moths described in 1951